St Helens railway station may refer to:
Current stations
St Helens Central railway station on the Liverpool–Wigan line in England
St Helens Junction railway station on the Liverpool–Manchester line in England
Former stations
St Helens Central railway station (Great Central Railway) (closed 1952), terminus of a branch line from Lowton St Mary's, England
St Helens railway station (Isle of Wight) (closed 1953), on the Bembridge branch in England
St Helens, one of the stops on the Swansea and Mumbles Railway (closed 1960) in Wales
West Auckland railway station, County Durham, England (closed 1962) known as St Helens until 1878